The End Times Tour was a double bill North American concert tour, co-headlined by American rock bands Marilyn Manson and The Smashing Pumpkins, with Cage opening. It was launched as a supporting 'tour within a tour' for Marilyn Manson's The Hell Not Hallelujah Tour. The End Times Tour supported both Manson's ninth studio album The Pale Emperor (2015) and the Smashing Pumpkins' tenth studio release, Monuments to an Elegy (2014).

The tour began on July 7 in Concord, California and concluded in Cincinnati on August 8. It spanned 23 dates and visited arenas in the United States and Canada. American hip hop recording artist Cage served as the opening act for the entirety of the tour. The tour's name was conceived as an amalgamation of the title of a song by each artist, the Pumpkins' "The End Is the Beginning Is the End" and Manson's "Astonishing Panorama of the Endtimes".

Following its conclusion, Marilyn Manson resumed their The Hell Not Hallelujah Tour, with three dates scheduled in Japan from August 14 onwards, and a European tour in November.

Background
Corgan and Manson's friendship dates back to the late 1990s, with Corgan serving as an unofficial consultant for the band during the early development stages of Manson's 1998 album Mechanical Animals. After playing a few of the early songs for him, Corgan advised the band that "This is definitely the right direction" but to "go all the way with it. Don't just hint at it," referring to the album's glam rock production style. The album, produced by Manson, Sean Beavan and Michael Beinhorn, was released on September 15, 1998, and went on to debut at number one on the Billboard 200, with first week sales of 223,000.

Following the release of Mechanical Animals, the pair's personal and professional relationship soured. A fifteen-year-long feud allegedly stemmed from Corgan writing a "strongly worded" letter to Manson, in which he claimed that actress Rose McGowan – who Manson was engaged to at the time – would "ruin my life and my career if I stayed with her." Manson responded by telling Corgan that "it would be a good marketing idea [to sell] Charlie Brown T-shirts and bald caps at [his] concerts", due to their similarity in appearance.

The pair publicly settled their rift when Manson performed his own "Third Day of a Seven Day Binge" and the Smashing Pumpkin's "Ava Adore" at the Camden Palace Theatre in London on December 5, 2014. They went on to perform the latter track again, when both bands appeared at the Australian music festival Soundwave.

Set lists 

Marilyn Manson

 "Deep Six"
 "Disposable Teens"
 "mOBSCENE"
 "No Reflection"
 "Third Day of a Seven Day Binge"
 "Sweet Dreams (Are Made of This)"
 "Angel With the Scabbed Wings"
 "The Love Song" or "Personal Jesus"
 "The Dope Show"
 "Rock Is Dead"
 "Lunchbox"
 "Antichrist Superstar"
 "The Beautiful People"
Encore
 "Coma White" or "Tourniquet" or "Man That You Fear"

The Smashing Pumpkins

 "Cherub Rock"
 "Bullet with Butterfly Wings"
 "Tonight, Tonight"
 "Ava Adore"
 "Drum + Fife"
 "One and All (We Are)"
 "The Everlasting Gaze"
 "Zero"
 "The Crying Tree of Mercury"
 "Mayonaise"
 "Disarm"
 "Landslide"
 "1979"
 "Run2Me"
 "Thru the Eyes of Ruby"
 "Stand Inside Your Love"
 "United States"
Encore
 "Today" or "Geek U.S.A." or "Cardinal Rule"

Shows

Lineup

Marilyn Manson
 Marilyn Manson – vocals
 Twiggy – bass guitar
 Paul Wiley – lead guitar
 Gil Sharone – drums
 Daniel Fox – keyboards, percussion
The Smashing Pumpkins
Billy Corgan – vocals, guitar
Jeff Schroeder – guitar
Jack Bates – bass
Jimmy Chamberlin – drums

References

Marilyn Manson (band) concert tours
2015 concert tours
Co-headlining concert tours
The Smashing Pumpkins